Ma Jiajue (4 May 1981 – 17 June 2004) was a Chinese biochemistry major at Yunnan University in China, who murdered his four university roommates in February 2004. Their bodies were found in a dormitory closet at the university. He was convicted of the quadruple murder and was executed.

Early life
Ma, who came from a remote farming village in the Guangxi Zhuang Autonomous Region in China, was the son of father Ma Jianfu and mother Li Fengying; he had an older brother and two sisters. He attended Binzhou Middle School for junior high school, where he was a top student, and Binyang Middle School for high school, where his academic effort diminished.

In November 1999 he ran away from home  out of fear that he would not be able to pass the gaokao college entrance exam. He was discovered by police in Guigang in eastern Guangxi after his school reported his disappearance, and received a disciplinary punishment upon his return. After passing his gaokao, Ma, the pride of his family, was given his family's meager savings; he enrolled in Yunnan University in September 2000, as a biochemistry student.

Murders and aftermath
According to his confession, Ma, in his final year of university, used a hammer to kill his four roommates, who were fellow students at Yunnan University, between February 13 and 15 in 2004. The roommates died due to blunt-force trauma. Ma said that he killed them because his roommates, who came from wealthier families, had accused him of cheating in a card game, and had bullied him regarding his plans for the Lunar New Year holiday. On February 23, following the holiday break, the roommates' bodies were discovered in a dormitory closet.

Ma Jiajue fled following the murders and was on the run for 21 days. Police offered a 200,000 yuan (US$24,000) reward for information that would result in his apprehension.

Legal proceedings and execution
The Intermediate People's Court of Kunming in southwest China's Yunnan Province sentenced Ma Jiajue to death on April 24. The Yunnan Provincial Higher People's Court did an automatic review of the verdict, and upheld it. On June 17, 2004, Ma Jiajue was executed.

Legacy
In 2004, Xinhua stated: "The murder case has attracted nationwide attention, with experts and ordinary people heatedly discussing how a college student could choose to kill his young schoolmates."

See also

 2022 University of Idaho killings, killing of four university roommates

References

1981 births
2004 deaths
2004 murders in China
21st-century Chinese criminals
21st-century executions by China
Chinese male criminals
Chinese mass murderers
Chinese people convicted of murder
Executed mass murderers
Executed people from Guangxi
Executed People's Republic of China people
Male murderers
People convicted of murder by the People's Republic of China
People executed by China by firearm
People executed for murder
People from Nanning
Yunnan University